The first edition of the Johan Cruyff Shield was held on 18 August 1996 at the Amsterdam Arena. Although this was the seventh Dutch Supercup match to be played, it was the first one held under the Johan Cruyff Shield title, with former editions being played under the name Dutch Supercup. This was also the first Supercup game to be held at the Amsterdam Arena. From this year on each Supercup game would be played there, with each KNVB Cup final being played at De Kuip in Rotterdam.

The match was the first competitive game to be played at the Amsterdam Arena, after a friendly match between Ajax and Milan four days earlier. It featured the winners of the 1995–96 Eredivisie champions Ajax, and the winners of the 1995–96 KNVB Cup, PSV Eindhoven. The match ended in a 3–0 victory for PSV, with a goal from René Eijkelkamp and two for Marc Degryse, making them the first winners of the Johan Cruyff Shield.

Match details

1996
Supercup
J
J
Johan Cruyff Shield